This is a list of the described species of the pseudoscorpion family Chthoniidae. The data is taken from Joel Hallan's Biology Catalog.

 Afrochthonius Beier, 1930
 Afrochthonius brincki Beier, 1955 — Lesotho
 Afrochthonius ceylonicus Beier, 1973 — Sri Lanka
 Afrochthonius godfreyi (Ellingsen, 1912) — Southern Africa
 Afrochthonius inaequalis Beier, 1958 — Southern Africa
 Afrochthonius natalensis Beier, 1931 — Southern Africa
 Afrochthonius reductus Beier, 1973 — Sri Lanka
 Afrochthonius similis Beier, 1930 — Namibia

 Allochthonius J.C. Chamberlin, 1929
 Allochthonius borealis Sato, 1984 — Japan
 Allochthonius buanensis W.K.Lee, 1982 — Korea
 Allochthonius kinkaiensis Sakayori, 2002 — Japan
 Allochthonius montanus Sakayori, 2000 — Honshu, Tochigi, Mount Kohshin, Japan
 Allochthonius opticus (Ellingsen, 1907) — Japan
 Allochthonius opticus opticus (Ellingsen, 1907) — Japan
 Allochthonius opticus coreanus Morikawa, 1970 — Korea
 Allochthonius opticus troglophilus Morikawa, 1956 — Japan
 Allochthonius shintoisticus J.C. Chamberlin, 1929 — Japan
 Allochthonius tamurai Sakayori, 1999 — Japan
 Allochthonius biocularis (Morikawa, 1956) — Japan
 Allochthonius ishikawai (Morikawa, 1954) — Japan
 Allochthonius ishikawai ishikawai (Morikawa, 1954) — Japan
 Allochthonius ishikawai deciclavatus (Morikawa, 1956) — Japan
 Allochthonius ishikawai kyushuensis (Morikawa, 1960) — Japan
 Allochthonius ishikawai shiragatakiensis (Morikawa, 1954) — Japan
 Allochthonius ishikawai uenoi (Morikawa, 1956) — Japan
 Allochthonius uyamadensis (Morikawa, 1954) — Japan

 Aphrastochthonius J.C. Chamberlin, 1962
 Aphrastochthonius alteriae Muchmore, 1977 — Mexico
 Aphrastochthonius cubanus Dumitresco & Orghidan, 1977 — Cuba
 Aphrastochthonius grubbsi Muchmore, 1984 — California
 Aphrastochthonius major Muchmore, 1973 — Mexico
 Aphrastochthonius pachysetus Muchmore, 1976 — New Mexico
 Aphrastochthonius palmitensis Muchmore, 1986 — Mexico
 Aphrastochthonius parvus Muchmore, 1972 — Mexico
 Aphrastochthonius patei Muchmore, 1982 — Mexico
 Aphrastochthonius pecki Muchmore, 1968 — Alabama
 Aphrastochthonius russelli Muchmore, 1972 — Mexico
 Aphrastochthonius similis Muchmore, 1984 — California
 Aphrastochthonius tenax J.C. Chamberlin, 1962
 Aphrastochthonius verapazanus Muchmore, 1972 — Guatemala

 Apochthonius J.C. Chamberlin, 1929
 Apochthonius coecus (Packard, 1884) — Virginia
 Apochthonius colecampi Muchmore, 1967 — Missouri
 Apochthonius diabolus Muchmore, 1967 — Arkansas
 Apochthonius forbesi Benedict, 1979 — Oregon
 Apochthonius grubbsi Muchmore, 1980 — California
 Apochthonius hobbsi Muchmore, 1994 — Ohio
 Apochthonius holsingeri Muchmore, 1967 — Virginia
 Apochthonius hypogeus Muchmore, 1976 — Virginia
 Apochthonius indianensis Muchmore, 1967 — Indiana
 Apochthonius intermedius J.C. Chamberlin, 1929 — Washington
 Apochthonius irwini R.O. Schuster, 1966 — California
 Apochthonius knowltoni Muchmore, 1980 — Wyoming
 Apochthonius magnanimus Hoff, 1956 — New Mexico
 Apochthonius malheuri Benedict & Malcolm, 1973 — Oregon
 Apochthonius maximus R.O. Schuster, 1966 — California
 Apochthonius minimus R.O. Schuster, 1966 — British Columbia, Oregon, Washington
 Apochthonius minor Muchmore, 1976 — Georgia
 Apochthonius moestus (Banks, 1891) — Eastern U.S.
 Apochthonius mysterius Muchmore, 1976 — Missouri
 Apochthonius occidentalis J.C. Chamberlin, 1929 — Oregon
 Apochthonius paucispinosus Muchmore, 1967 — West Virginia
 Apochthonius russelli Muchmore, 1976 — Alabama
 Apochthonius titanicus Muchmore, 1976 — Arkansas
 Apochthonius typhlus Muchmore, 1967 — Missouri

 Austrochthonius J.C. Chamberlin, 1929
 Austrochthonius argentinae Hoff, 1950 — Argentina, Brazil
 Austrochthonius australis Hoff, 1951 — Australia
 Austrochthonius bolivianus Beier, 1930 — Bolivia
 Austrochthonius cavicola Beier, 1968 — Australia
 Austrochthonius chilensis (J.C. Chamberlin, 1923)
 Austrochthonius chilensis chilensis (J.C. Chamberlin, 1923) — Chile, Argentina
 Austrochthonius chilensis magalhanicus Beier, 1964 — Chile
 Austrochthonius chilensis transversus Beier, 1964 — Argentina
 Austrochthonius easti Harvey, 1991 — western Australia
 Austrochthonius iguazuensis Vitali-di Castri, 1975 — Brazil
 Austrochthonius insularis Vitali-di Castri, 1968 — Crozet Islands
 Austrochthonius mordax Beier, 1967 — New Zealand
 Austrochthonius paraguayensis Vitali-di Castri, 1975 — Paraguay
 Austrochthonius parvus (Mello-Leitão, 1939) — Argentina
 Austrochthonius persimilis Beier, 1930 — Chile
 Austrochthonius rapax Beier, 1976 — New Zealand
 Austrochthonius semiserratus Beier, 1930 — Chile
 Austrochthonius tullgerni (Beier, 1931) — Southern Africa
 Austrochthonius zealandicus Beier, 1966 — New Zealand
 Austrochthonius zealandicus zealandicus Beier, 1966 — New Zealand
 Austrochthonius zealandicus obscurus Beier, 1966 — New Zealand

 Caribchthonius Muchmore, 1976
 Caribchthonius butleri Muchmore, 1976 — Virgin Islands
 Caribchthonius orthodentatus Muchmore, 1976 — Belize

 Centrochthonius Beier, 1931
 Centrochthonius koslovi (Redikorzev, 1918) — Tibet, India, Nepal
 Centrochthonius schnitnikovi (Redikorzev, 1934) — Russia
 Centrochthonius sichuanensis Schawaller, 1995 — Sichuan

 Chiliochthonius Vitali-di Castri, 1975
 Chiliochthonius centralis Vitali-di Castri, 1975 — Chile
 Chiliochthonius montanus Vitali-di Castri, 1975 — Chile
 Chiliochthonius usuriensis Beier, 1979 — Russia (?)

 Chthonius C.L. Koch, 1843
 Chthonius absoloni Beier, 1938 — Yugoslavia
 Chthonius agazzii Beier, 1966 — Italy
 Chthonius alpicola Beier, 1951 — Austria, Italy
 Chthonius apollinis Mahnert, 1978 — Greece
 Chthonius azerbaidzhanus Schawaller & Dashdamirov, 1988 — Azerbaijan
 Chthonius baccettii Callaini, 1980 — Italy
 Chthonius balazuci Vachon, 1963 — France
 Chthonius bogovinae Curcic, 1972 — Yugoslavia
 Chthonius bogovinae bogovinae Curcic, 1972 — Yugoslavia
 Chthonius bogovinae latidentatus Curcic, 1972 — Yugoslavia
 Chthonius brandmayri Callaini, 1986 — Yugoslavia
 Chthonius caprai Gardini, 1977 — Italy
 Chthonius caoduroi Callaini, 1987 — Italy
 Chthonius cavernarum Ellingsen, 1909 — Romania, Yugoslavia
 Chthonius cavophilus Hadzi, 1939 — Bulgaria
 Chthonius cebenicus Leclerc, 1981 — France
 Chthonius cephalotes (Simon, 1875) — France
 Chthonius chamberlini (Leclerc, 1983) — Algeria, France
 Chthonius comottii Inzaghi, 1987 — Italy
 Chthonius cryptus J.C. Chamberlin, 1962 — Greece
 Chthonius dacnodes Navás, 1918 — Spain, Azores, Italy
 Chthonius dalmatinus Hadzi, 1930 — Yugoslavia
 Chthonius densedentatus Beier, 1938 — Italy, Yugoslavia
 Chthonius diophthalmus Daday, 1888 — eastern Europe
 Chthonius doderoi Beier, 1930 — France, Italy
 Chthonius doderoi doderoi Beier, 1930 — France, Italy
 Chthonius doderoi horridus Beier, 1934 — Italy
 Chthonius ellingseni Beier, 1928 — Italy, Yugoslavia
 Chthonius elongatus Lazzeroni, 1970 — Italy
 Chthonius euganeus Gardini, 1991 — Italy
 Chthonius exarmatus Beier, 1939 — Yugoslavia
 Chthonius graecus Beier, 1963 — Greece
 Chthonius guglielmii Callaini, 1986 — Italy
 Chthonius halberti Kew, 1916 — France, Great Britain
 Chthonius herbarii Mahnert, 1980 — Crete
 Chthonius heterodactylus Tomosvary, 1882 — central Europe
 Chthonius heutaultae Leclerc, 1981 — France
 Chthonius hungaricus Mahnert, 1981 — Hungary
 Chthonius ilvensis Beier, 1963 — Italy
 Chthonius imperator Mahnert, 1978 — Greece
 Chthonius ischnocheles (Hermann, 1804) — Europe, U.S.
 Chthonius ischnocheles ischnocheles (Hermann, 1804) — Europe, U.S.
 Chthonius ischnocheles reductus Beier, 1939 — southern Europe
 Chthonius ischnocheles ruffoi Caporiacco, 1951 — Italy
 Chthonius ischnocheles stammeri Beier, 1942 — Italy
 Chthonius ischnocheloides Beier, 1974 — Italy
 Chthonius italicus Beier, 1930 — Italy
 Chthonius iugoslavicus Curcic, 1972 — Yugoslavia
 Chthonius jalzici Curcic, 1988 — Yugoslavia
 Chthonius jonicus Beier, 1931 — southern Europe
 Chthonius jugorum Beier, 1952 — Italy
 Chthonius karamanianus Hadzi, 1937 — Yugoslavia
 Chthonius lanzai Caporiacco, 1947 — Italy
 Chthonius lanzai lanzai Caporiacco, 1947 — Italy
 Chthonius lanzai vannii Callaini, 1986 — Italy
 Chthonius leoi (Callaini, 1988) — Sardinia
 Chthonius leruthi Beier, 1939 — Romania
 Chthonius lesnik Curcic, 1994 — Yugoslavia
 Chthonius lessiniensis Schawaller, 1982 — Italy
 Chthonius ligusticus Beier, 1930 — Italy 
 Chthonius lindbergi Beier, 1956 — Crete
 Chthonius litoralis Hadzi, 1933 — Italy, Yugoslavia
 Chthonius lucifugus Mahnert, 1977 — France, Spain
 Chthonius macedonicus Curcic, 1972 — Yugoslavia
 Chthonius magnificus Beier, 1938 — Yugoslavia
 Chthonius malatestai Callaini, 1980 — Italy
 Chthonius mauritanicus (Callaini, 1988) — Morocco
 Chthonius mayi Heurtault-Rossi, 1968 — France
 Chthonius mazaurici Leclerc, 1981 — France
 Chthonius mazaurici mazaurici Leclerc, 1981 — France
 Chthonius mazaurici coironi Leclerc, 1981 — France
 † Chthonius mengei Beier, 1937 — fossil: Baltic amber
 Chthonius microphthalmus Simon, 1879 — France, Spain
 Chthonius mingazzinii Callaini, 1991 — Italy
 Chthonius minotaurus Henderickx, 1997 — Kournas Cave, Crete
 Chthonius monicae Boghean, 1989 — Romania
 Chthonius motasi Dumitresco & Orghidan, 1964 — Romania
 Chthonius multidentatus Beier, 1963 — Sicily
 Chthonius occultus Beier, 1939 — Yugoslavia
 Chthonius orthodactyloides Beier, 1967 — Turkey
 Chthonius orthodactylus (Leach, 1817) — Europe
 Chthonius pacificus Muchmore, 1968 — California
 Chthonius paganus (Hoff, 1961) — Colorado
 Chthonius paludis (J.C. Chamberlin, 1929) — southern U.S.
 Chthonius paolettii Beier, 1974 — Italy
 Chthonius persimilis Beier, 1939 — Yugoslavia
 Chthonius petrochilosi Heurtault, 1972 — Greece
 Chthonius pivai Gardini, 1991 — Italy
 Chthonius ponticoides Mahnert, 1975 — Greece
 Chthonius ponticus Beier, 1965 — Turkey
 Chthonius porevidi Curcic, Makarov & Lucic, 1998 — Krivosije, Knezlaz Pecina Cave, Montenegro
 † Chthonius pristinus Schawaller, 1978 — fossil: Baltic amber
 Chthonius prove Curcic, Dimitrijevic & Makarov, 1997 — Gornji Morinj, Serbia, Montenegro
 Chthonius pusillus Beier, 1947 — Austria
 Chthonius pygmaeus Beier, 1934 — central Europe
 Chthonius pygmaeus pygmaeus Beier, 1934 — central Europe
 Chthonius pygmaeus carinthiacus Beier, 1951 — central Europe
 Chthonius radjai Curcic, 1988 — Yugoslavia
 Chthonius raridentatus Hadzi, 1930 — Yugoslavia
 Chthonius ressli Beier, 1956 — Austria, France, Italy
 Chthonius satapliaensis Schawaller & Dashdamirov, 1988 — Russia
 Chthonius sestasi Mahnert, 1980 — Greece
 Chthonius shelkovnikovi Redikorzev, 1930 — western Asia
 Chthonius shulovi Beier, 1963 — Israel
 Chthonius stevanovici Curcic, 1986 — Yugoslavia
 Chthonius strinatii Mahnert, 1975 — Greece
 Chthonius submontanus Beier, 1963 — central Europe
 Chthonius subterraneus Beier, 1931 — Hungary, Yugoslavia
 Chthonius subterraneus subterraneus Beier, 1931 — Hungary, Yugoslavia
 Chthonius subterraneus meuseli Beier, 1939 — Yugoslavia
 Chthonius tadzhikistanicus Dashdamirov & Schawaller, 1992 — Tajikistan
 Chthonius tenuis L. Koch, 1873 — Europe, Algeria
 Chthonius thessalus Mahnert, 1980 — Greece
 Chthonius trebinjensis Beier, 1938 — Yugoslavia
 Chthonius troglobius Hadzi, 1937 — Yugoslavia
 Chthonius troglodites Redikorzev, 1928 — Bulgaria
 Chthonius tzanoudakisi Mahnert, 1975 — Greece
 Chthonius aegatensis (Callaini, 1989) — Sicilly
 Chthonius aguileraorum Carabajal Marquez, Garcia Carrillo & Rodriguez Fernandez, 2000 — Cadiz, Villaluenga del Rosario, Cueva de la Hiedra, Spain
 Chthonius amatei Carabajal Marquez, Garcia Carrillo & Rodriguez Fernandez, 2001 — Spain
 Chthonius anatolicus (Beier, 1969) — Iran, Turkey
 Chthonius anophthalmus (Ellingsen, 1908) — Algeria
 Chthonius apulicus (Beier, 1958) — Italy
 Chthonius asturiensis (Beier, 1955) — Spain
 Chthonius atlantis (Mahnert, 1980) — Morocco
 Chthonius balearicus (Mahnert, 1977) — Balearic Islands
 Chthonius bartolii (Gardini, 1976) — Italy
 Chthonius bauneensis (Callaini, 1983) — Sardinia
 Chthonius beieri (Lazzeroni, 1966) — Italy
 Chthonius bellesi (Mahnert, 1989) — Balearic Islands
 Chthonius berninii (Callaini, 1983) — Sardinia
 Chthonius bidentatus (Beier, 1938) — Yugoslavia
 Chthonius boldorii (Beier, 1934) — Italy, Yugoslavia
 Chthonius bolivari (Beier, 1930) — Spain
 Chthonius cabreriensis Mahnert, 1993 — Balearic Islands
 Chthonius cassolai (Beier, 1974) — Sardinia
 Chthonius catalonicus (Beier, 1939) — Spain
 Chthonius cavicola Gardini, 1990 — Italy
 Chthonius chius Schawaller, 1990 — Greece
 Chthonius concii (Beier, 1953) — Italy
 Chthonius corcyraeus (Mahnert, 1976) — Greece
 Chthonius corsicus (Callaini, 1981) — Corsica
 Chthonius creticus (Mahnert, 1980) — Crete
 Chthonius daedaleus (Mahnert, 1980) — Crete
 Chthonius distinguendus (Beier, 1930) — Spain
 Chthonius dubius Mahnert, 1993 — Canary Islands
 Chthonius elbanus (Beier, 1963) — Italy, Morocco
 Chthonius fuscimanus (Simon, 1900) — central Europe, Turkey
 Chthonius gasparoi (Gardini, 1989) — Greece
 Chthonius genuensis Gardini, 1990 — Italy
 Chthonius gestroi (Simon, 1989) — Italy
 Chthonius gibbus (Beier, 1953) — Spain, Italy
 Chthonius girgentiensis (Mahnert, 1982) — Malta
 Chthonius giustii (Callaini, 1981) — Corsica
 Chthonius gracilimanus Mahnert, 1997 — La Palma, Mazo, Salto de Tigalate, Canary Islands
 Chthonius grafittii (Gardini, 1981) — Sardinia
 Chthonius hiberus (Beier, 1930) — Spain
 Chthonius hispanus (Beier, 1930) — Spain, Portugal
 Chthonius insularis (Beier, 1938) — Yugoslavia
 Chthonius iranicus (Beier, 1971) — Iran
 Chthonius kabylicus (Callaini, 1983) — Algeria
 Chthonius kemza Curcic, Lee & Makarov, 1993 — Yugoslavia
 Chthonius kewi (Gabbutt, 1966) — Great Britain
 Chthonius longesetosus (Mahnert, 1976) — Morocco
 Chthonius lucanus (Callaini, 1984) — Italy
 Chthonius machadoi (Vachon, 1940) — Spain, Morocco
 Chthonius machadoi machadoi (Vachon, 1940) — Spain, Morocco
 Chthonius machadoi canariensis (Beier, 1965) — Canary Islands
 Chthonius mahnerti (Zaragoza, 1984) — Spain
 Chthonius maltensis (Mahnert, 1975) — Malta
 Chthonius mariolae Carabajal Marquez, Garcia Carrillo & Rodriguez Fernandez, 2001 — Spain
 Chthonius maroccanus (Mahnert, 1980) — Morocco
 Chthonius mayorali Carabajal Marquez, Garcia Carrillo & Rodriguez Fernandez, 2001 — Spain
 Chthonius microtuberculatus (Hadzi, 1937) — Bulgaria, Yugoslavia
 Chthonius minous (Mahnert, 1980) — Crete
 Chthonius minous minous (Mahnert, 1980) — Crete
 Chthonius minous peramae (Mahnert, 1980) — Crete
 Chthonius minutus (Vachon, 1940) — Portugal
 Chthonius nanus (Beier, 1953) — Italy
 Chthonius nerjaensis Carabajal Marquez, Garcia Carrillo & Rodriguez Fernandez, 2001 — Spain
 Chthonius nidicola (Mahnert, 1979) — Switzerland
 Chthonius parmensis (Beier, 1963) — Italy
 Chthonius pieltaini (Beier, 1930) — Italy
 Chthonius pinai (Zaragoza, 1985) — Spain
 Chthonius platakisi (Mahnert, 1980) — Crete
 Chthonius poeninus (Mahnert, 1979) — Switzerland
 Chthonius ponsi Mahnert, 1993 — Balearic Islands
 Chthonius poseidonis Gardini, 1993 — Sardinia
 Chthonius pyrenaicus (Beier, 1934) — France, Spain
 Chthonius remyi (Heurtault, 1975) — Corsica
 Chthonius rimicola Mahnert, 1993 — Canary Islands
 Chthonius romanicus (Beier, 1935) — Greece, Iran
 Chthonius ruizporteroi Carabajal Marquez, Garcia Carrillo & Rodriguez Fernandez, 2001 — Spain
 Chthonius sacer (Beier, 1963) — Israel
 Chthonius samius (Mahnert, 1982) — Greece
 Chthonius schmalfussi Schawaller, 1990 — Greece
 Chthonius scythicus Georgescu & Capuse, 1994 — Romania
 Chthonius sendrai (Zaragoza, 1985) — Spain
 Chthonius serbicus (Hadzi, 1937) — Bulgaria, Yugoslavia
 Chthonius setosus Mahnert, 1993 — Canary Islands
 Chthonius siculus (Beier, 1961) — Italy, Spain
 Chthonius siscoensis (Heurtault, 1975) — Corsica
 Chthonius tetrachelatus (Preyssler, 1790) — Cosmopolitan
 Chthonius troglophilus (Beier, 1920) — Italy
 Chthonius tuberculatus (Hadzi, 1937) — central Europe, Greece
 Chthonius vachoni (Heurtault-Rossi, 1963) — France
 Chthonius ventalloi (Beier, 1939) — Spain
 Chthonius ventalloi ventalloi (Beier, 1939) — Spain
 Chthonius ventalloi cazorlensis (Carabajal Marquez, Garcia Carrillo & Rodriguez Fernandez, 2001) — Spain
 Chthonius verai (Zaragoza, 1987) — Spain
 Chthonius virginicus (J.C. Chamberlin, 1929) — Eastern U.S.
 Chthonius zoiai Gardini, 1990 — Italy
 Chthonius abnormis (Beier, 1939) — Yugoslavia
 Chthonius caligatus (Beier, 1938) — Yugoslavia
 Chthonius cavernicola (Beier, 1938) — Yugoslavia
 Chthonius cerberus (Beier, 1938) — Yugoslavia
 Chthonius globifer (Simon, 1879) — France, Switzerland
 Chthonius pancici (Curbic, 1972) — Yugoslavia
 Chthonius polychaetus (Hadzi, 1937) — Yugoslavia
 Chthonius purgo Curcic, Lee & Makarov, 1993 — Yugoslavia
 Chthonius simplex (Beier, 1939) — Yugoslavia
 Chthonius spelaeophilus (Hadzi, 1930) — Yugoslavia
 Chthonius spelaeophilus spelaeophilus (Hadzi, 1930) — Yugoslavia
 Chthonius spelaeophilus histricus (Beier, 1931) — Yugoslavia, Italy
 Chthonius vandeli (Dumitresco & Orghidan, 1964) — Romania
 Chthonius californicus (J.C. Chamberlin, 1929) — California
 Chthonius oregonicus (Muchmore, 1968) — Oregon
 Chthonius spingolus (R.O. Schuster, 1962) — California
 Chthonius karamani (Hadzi, 1933) — Yugoslavia
 Chthonius rogatus (Beier, 1938) — Yugoslavia

 Congochthonius Beier, 1959
 Congochthonius nanus Beier, 1959 — Democratic Republic of Congo

 Drepanochthonius Beier, 1964
 Drepanochthonius horridus Beier, 1964 — Chile

 Francochthonius Vitali-di Castri, 1975
 Francochthonius Vitali-di Castri, 1975 — Chile

 Kleptochthonius J.C. Chamberlin, 1949
 Kleptochthonius crosbyi (J.C. Chamberlin, 1929) — Kentucky, North Carolina
 Kleptochthonius geophilus Malcolm & J.C. Chamberlin, 1961 — Oregon
 Kleptochthonius griseomanus Muchmore, 2000 — Hoosier National Forest, Indian Cave, Indiana
 Kleptochthonius inusitatus Muchmore, 1994 — Ohio
 Kleptochthonius lewisorum Muchmore, 2000 — Harrison County, Baelz Cave, Indiana
 Kleptochthonius magnus Muchmore, 1966 — Tennessee
 Kleptochthonius multispinosus (Hoff, 1945) — Eastern U.S.
 Kleptochthonius oregonus Malcolm & J.C. Chamberlin, 1961 — Oregon
 Kleptochthonius polychaetus Muchmore, 1994 — Virginia
 Kleptochthonius sheari Muchmore, 1994 — West Virginia
 Kleptochthonius affinis (Muchmore, 1976) — Tennessee
 Kleptochthonius anophthalmus (Muchmore, 1970) — Virginia
 Kleptochthonius attenuatus (Malcolm & J.C. Chamberlin, 1961) — Kentucky
 Kleptochthonius barri (Muchmore, 1965) — Tennessee
 Kleptochthonius binoculatus (Muchmore, 1974) — Virginia
 Kleptochthonius cerberus (Malcolm & J.C. Chamberlin, 1961) — Kentucky
 Kleptochthonius charon (Muchmore, 1965) — Tennessee
 Kleptochthonius daemonius (Muchmore, 1965) — Tennessee
 Kleptochthonius erebicus (Muchmore, 1965) — Kentucky
 Kleptochthonius gertschi (Malcolm & J.C. Chamberlin, 1961) — Virginia
 Kleptochthonius hageni (Muchmore, 1963) — Kentucky
 Kleptochthonius henroti (Vachon, 1952) West Virginia
 Kleptochthonius hetricki (Muchmore, 1974) — West Virginia
 Kleptochthonius hubrichti (Muchmore, 1965) — Kentucky
 Kleptochthonius infernalis (Malcolm & J.C. Chamberlin, 1961) — Tennessee
 Kleptochthonius krekeleri (Muchmore, 1965) — Kentucky
 Kleptochthonius lutzi (Malcolm & J.C. Chamberlin, 1961); — Tennessee
 Kleptochthonius microphthalmus (Malcolm & J.C. Chamberlin, 1961) — Kentucky
 Kleptochthonius myoplus (Malcolm & J.C. Chamberlin, 1961) — Tennessee
 Kleptochthonius orpheus (Muchmore, 1965) — West Virginia
 Kleptochthonius packardi (Hagen, 1879)
 Kleptochthonius pluto (Muchmore, 1965) — Tennessee
 Kleptochthonius proserpinae (Muchmore, 1965) — West Virginia
 Kleptochthonius proximosetus (Muchmore, 1976) — Virginia
 Kleptochthonius regulus (Muchmore, 1970) — Virginia
 Kleptochthonius rex (Malcolm & J.C. Chamberlin, 1961) — Tennessee
 Kleptochthonius similis (Muchmore, 1976) — Virginia
 Kleptochthonius stygius (Muchmore, 1965) — Tennessee
 Kleptochthonius tantalus (Muchmore, 1966) — Tennessee

 Lagynochthonius Beier, 1951
 Lagynochthonius annamensis (Beier, 1951) — Vietnam
 Lagynochthonius arctus (Beier, 1967) — New Guinea
 Lagynochthonius australicus (Beier, 1966) — Australia
 Lagynochthonius bakeri (J.C. Chamberlin, 1929) — Philippines
 Lagynochthonius brincki (Beier, 1973) — Sri Lanka
 Lagynochthonius curvidigitatus Mahnert, 1997 — Tenerife, Cueva Felipe Reventon, Canary Islands
 Lagynochthonius dybasi (Beier, 1957) — Palau
 Lagynochthonius exiguus (Beier, 1952) — Malaysia
 Lagynochthonius flavus (Mahnert, 1986) — Kenya
 Lagynochthonius guasirih (Mahnert, 1988) — Sarawak
 Lagynochthonius hamatus Harvey, 1988 — Sumatra
 Lagynochthonius himalayensis (Morikawa, 1968) — Nepal
 Lagynochthonius hygricus Murthy & Ananthakrishnan, 1977 — India
 Lagynochthonius indicus (Murthy & Ananthakrishnan, 1977) — India
 Lagynochthonius johni (Redikorzev, 1922) — Indonesia, Philippines
 Lagynochthonius kapi Harvey, 1988 — Indonesia
 Lagynochthonius kenyensis (Mahnert, 1986) — Kenya
 Lagynochthonius mordor Harvey, 1989 — Australia
 Lagynochthonius nagaminei (Sato, 1983) — Japan
 Lagynochthonius novaeguineae (Beier, 1965) — New Guinea
 Lagynochthonius paucedentatus (Beier, 1955) — Malaysia
 Lagynochthonius ponapensis (Beier, 1957) — Caroline Islands
 Lagynochthonius roeweri (J.C. Chamberlin, 1930) — Java
 Lagynochthonius salomonensis (Beier, 1966) — Solomon Islands
 Lagynochthonius sinensis (Beier, 1967) — China
 Lagynochthonius thorntoni Harvey, 1988 — Java
 Lagynochthonius tonkinensis (Beier, 1951) — Vietnam

 Malcolmochthonius Benedict, 1978
 Malcolmochthonius malcolmi Benedict, 1978 — Oregon
 Malcolmochthonius oregonus Benedict, 1978 — Oregon
 Malcolmochthonius perplexus Benedict, 1978 — California

 Maorichthonius J.C. Chamberlin, 1925
 Maorichthonius mortenseni J.C. Chamberlin, 1925 — New Zealand

 Mexichthonius Muchmore, 1975
 Mexichthonius exoticus Muchmore, 1996 — Texas
 Mexichthonius pacal Muchmore, 1978 — Mexico
 Mexichthonius unicus Muchmore, 1975 — Mexico

 Mundochthonius J.C. Chamberlin, 1929
 Mundochthonius alpinus Beier, 1947 — Austria
 Mundochthonius basarukini Schawaller, 1989 — Russia
 Mundochthonius bifurcatus Kim & Hong, 1994 — South Korea
 Mundochthonius carpaticus Rafalski, 1948 — Poland, Ukraine
 Mundochthonius cavernicola Muchmore, 1968 — Illinois
 Mundochthonius decoui Dumitresco & Orghidan, 1970 — Romania
 Mundochthonius dominicanus Muchmore, 1996 — Dominican Republic
 Mundochthonius erosidens J.C. Chamberlin, 1929 — California
 Mundochthonius holsingeri Benedict & Malcolm, 1974 — Virginia
 Mundochthonius japonicus J.C. Chamberlin, 1929 — Japan
 Mundochthonius japonicus japonicus J.C. Chamberlin, 1929 — Japan
 Mundochthonius japonicus imadatei Morikawa, 1956 — Japan
 Mundochthonius japonicus scolytidis Morikawa, 1954 — Japan
 Mundochthonius japonicus tripartitus Morikawa, 1956 — Japan
 Mundochthonius kiyoshii Sakayori, 2002 — Japan
 Mundochthonius magnus J.C. Chamberlin, 1929 — California
 Mundochthonius mexicanus Muchmore, 1973 — Mexico
 Mundochthonius minusculus Kim & Hong, 1994 — South Korea
 Mundochthonius montanus J.C. Chamberlin, 1929 — Colorado, New Mexico
 Mundochthonius pacificus (Banks, 1893) — western U.S.
 Mundochthonius rossi Hoff, 1949 — central U.S.
 Mundochthonius sandersoni Hoff, 1949 — Illinois
 Mundochthonius singularis Muchmore, 2001 — Fremont County, Canon City, Fly Cave, Colorado
 Mundochthonius styriacus Beier, 1971 — Austria
 Mundochthonius ussuricus Beier, 1979 — Russia

 Neochthonius J.C. Chamberlin, 1929
 Neochthonius amplus (R.O. Schuster, 1962) — California
 Neochthonius decoui (Georgescu & Capuse, 1994) — Romania
 Neochthonius imperialis Muchmore, 1996 — California
 Neochthonius stanfordianus J.C. Chamberlin, 1929 — California
 Neochthonius troglodytes Muchmore, 1969 — California

 Paraliochthonius Beier, 1956
 Paraliochthonius azanius Mahnert, 1986 — Kenya
 Paraliochthonius canariensis Vachon, 1961 — Canary Islands
 Paraliochthonius carpenteri Muchmore, 1984 — Bahamas
 Paraliochthonius hoestlandti Vachon, 1960 — Madeira Islands
 Paraliochthonius hoestlandti hoestlandti Vachon, 1960 — Madeira Islands
 Paraliochthonius insulae Hoff, 1963 — Jamaica
 Paraliochthonius johnstoni (J.C. Chamberlin, 1923) — Mexico
 Paraliochthonius martini Mahnert, 1989 — Canary Islands
 Paraliochthonius mirus Mahnert, 2002 — Canary Islands
 Paraliochthonius puertoricensis Muchmore, 1967 — Puerto Rico
 Paraliochthonius singularis (Menozzi, 1924) — Europe
 Paraliochthonius takashimai (Morikawa, 1958) — Japan
 Paraliochthonius tenebrarum Mahnert, 1989 — Canary Islands
 Paraliochthonius weygoldti Muchmore, 1967 — Florida

 Pseudochthonius Balzan, 1892
 Pseudochthonius arubensis Wagenaar-Hummelinck, 1948 — Aruba
 Pseudochthonius beieri Mahnert, 1978 — Republic of Congo
 Pseudochthonius billae Vachon, 1941 — Ivory Coast
 Pseudochthonius biseriatus Mahnert, 2001 — Minas Gerais, Itacarambi, Gruta Olhos dAgua, Brazil
 Pseudochthonius brasiliensis Beier, 1970 — Brazil
 Pseudochthonius clarus Hoff, 1963 — Jamaica
 Pseudochthonius congicus Beier, 1959 — Democratic Republic of Congo
 Pseudochthonius doctus Hoff, 1963 — Jamaica
 Pseudochthonius falcatus Muchmore, 1977 — Belize
 Pseudochthonius galapagensis Beier, 1977 — Galapagos
 Pseudochthonius gracilmanus Mahnert, 2001 — Bahia, Gruta Azul, Iraquara, Brazil
 Pseudochthonius heterodentatus Hoff, 1946 — Trinidad
 Pseudochthonius homodentatus J.C. Chamberlin, 1929 — Venezuela
 Pseudochthonius insularis J.C. Chamberlin, 1929 — St. Vincent
 Pseudochthonius leleupi Beier, 1959 — Democratic Republic of Congo
 Pseudochthonius moralesi Muchmore, 1977 — Mexico
 Pseudochthonius mundanus Hoff, 1963 — Jamaica
 Pseudochthonius naranjitensis (Ellingsen, 1902) — Ecuador
 Pseudochthonius orthodactylus Muchmore, 1970 — Brazil
 Pseudochthonius perreti Mahnert, 1986 — Kenya
 Pseudochthonius pulchellus (Ellingsen, 1902) — Ecuador
 Pseudochthonius ricardoi Mahnert, 2001 — Sao Paulo, Vale do Betari, Caverna Agua Suja, Brazil
 Pseudochthonius simoni (Balzan, 1892) — Venezuela
 † Pseudochthonius squamosus Schawaller, 1980 — fossil: Dominican amber
 Pseudochthonius strinatii Beier, 1969 — Brazil
 Pseudochthonius thibaudi Vitali-di Castro, 1984 — Guadeloupe
 Pseudochthonius troglobius Muchmore, 1986 — Mexico
 Pseudochthonius tuxeni Mahnert, 1979 — Brazil
 Pseudochthonius yucatanus Muchmore, 1977 — Mexico

 Pseudotyrannochthonius Beier, 1930
 Pseudotyrannochthonius australiensis Beier, 1966 — Australia
 Pseudotyrannochthonius bornemisszai Beier, 1966 — Australia
 Pseudotyrannochthonius dentifer (Morikawa, 1970) — Korea
 Pseudotyrannochthonius giganteus Beier, 1971 — Australia
 Pseudotyrannochthonius gigas Beier, 1979 — Australia
 Pseudotyrannochthonius gracilis Benedict & Malcolm, 1970 — California, Washington
 Pseudotyrannochthonius hamiltonsmithi Beier, 1968 — Australia
 Pseudotyrannochthonius incognitus (R.O. Schuster, 1966) — western U.S.
 Pseudotyrannochthonius jonesi (J.C. Chamberlin, 1962) — Australia
 Pseudotyrannochthonius kobayashii (Morikawa, 1956) — Japan
 Pseudotyrannochthonius kobayashii kobayashii (Morikawa, 1956) — Japan
 Pseudotyrannochthonius kobayashii akiyoshiensis (Morikawa, 1956) — Japan
 Pseudotyrannochthonius kobayashii dorogawaensis (Morikawa, 1960) — Japan
 Pseudotyrannochthonius kubotai (Morkawa, 1954) — Japan
 Pseudotyrannochthonius octospinosus Beier, 1930 — Chile
 Pseudotyrannochthonius queenslandicus Beier, 1969 — Australia
 Pseudotyrannochthonius rossi Beier, 1964 — Chile
 Pseudotyrannochthonius silvestrii (Ellingsen, 1905) — Chile
 Pseudotyrannochthonius solitarius (Hoff, 1951) — Australia
 Pseudotyrannochthonius tasmanicus Dartnall, 1970 — Tasmania
 Pseudotyrannochthonius typhlus Dartnall, 1970 — Tasmania
 Pseudotyrannochthonius undecimclavatus (Morikawa, 1956) — Japan
 Pseudotyrannochthonius undecimclavatus undecimclavatus (Morikawa, 1956) — Japan
 Pseudotyrannochthonius undecimclavatus kishidai (Morikawa, 1960) — Japan 
 Pseudotyrannochthonius utahensis Muchmore, 1967 — Utah

 Sathrochthoniella Beier, 1967
 Sathrochthoniella zealandica Beier, 1967 — New Zealand

 Sathrochthonius J.C. Chamberlin, 1962
 Sathrochthonius crassidens Beier, 1966 — Australia
 Sathrochthonius insulanus Beier, 1976 — Lord Howe Island
 Sathrochthonius kaltenbachi Beier, 1966 — New Caledonia
 Sathrochthonius maoricus Beier, 1976 — New Zealand
 Sathrochthonius pefauri Vitali-di Castro, 1974 — Chile
 Sathrochthonius tuena J. C. Chamberlin, 1962 — Australia
 Sathrochthonius tullgreni J. C. Chamberlin, 1962 — Australia
 Sathrochthonius venezuelanus Muchmore, 1989 — Venezuela
 Sathrochthonius webbi Muchmore, 1982 — Australia

 Selachochthonius J. C. Chamberlin, 1929
 Selachochthonius cavernicola Lawrence, 1935 — Southern Africa
 Selachochthonius heterodentata Beier, 1955 — Southern Africa
 Selachochthonius serratidentaus (Ellingsen, 1912) — Southern Africa

 Spelyngochthonius Beier, 1955
 Spelyngochthonius beieri Gardini, 1994 — Sardinia
 Spelyngochthonius grafittii Gardini, 1994 — Sardinia
 Spelyngochthonius heurtaultae Vachon, 1967 — Spain, Sardinia
 Spelyngochthonius provincialis Vachon & Heurtault-Rossi, 1964 — France
 Spelyngochthonius sardous Beier, 1955 — Sardinia

 Stygiochthonius Carabajal Marquez, Garcia Carrillo & Rodriguez Fernandez, 2001
 Stygiochthonius barrancoi Carabajal Marquez, Garcia Carrillo & Rodriguez Fernandez, 2001 — Spain

 Troglochthonius Beier, 1939
 Troglochthonius doratodactylus Helversen, 1968 — Italy
 Troglochthonius mirabilis Beier, 1939 — Yugoslavia

 Tyrannochthoniella Beier, 1966
 Tyrannochthoniella zealandica Beier, 1966 — New Zealand
 Tyrannochthoniella zealandica zealandica Beier, 1966 — New Zealand
 Tyrannochthoniella zealandica foveauxana Beier, 1967 — New Zealand

 Tyrannochthonius J.C. Chamberlin, 1929
 Tyrannochthonius alabamensis Muchmore, 1996 — Alabama
 Tyrannochthonius aladdinensis Chamberlin, in Muchmore & Chamberlin 1995 — Alabama
 Tyrannochthonius albidus (Beier, 1977) — Galapagos
 Tyrannochthonius amazonicus Mahnert, 1979 — Brazil
 Tyrannochthonius aralu Chamberlin, in Muchmore & Chamberlin 1995 — Alabama
 Tyrannochthonius archeri Chamberlin, in Muchmore & Chamberlin 1995 — Alabama
 Tyrannochthonius assimilis Hong & Tae Heung Ki, 1993 — South Korea
 Tyrannochthonius attenuatus Muchmore, 1996 — Alabama
 Tyrannochthonius avernicolus Chamberlin, in Muchmore & Chamberlin 1995 — Alabama
 Tyrannochthonius bagus Harvey, 1988 — Sumatra
 Tyrannochthonius bahamensis Muchmore, 1984 — Bahamas
 Tyrannochthonius barri Muchmore, 1996 — Alabama
 Tyrannochthonius beieri Morikawa, 1963 — New Guinea, Solomons
 Tyrannochthonius binoculatus Muchmore, 1996 — Alabama
 Tyrannochthonius bispinosus (Beier, 1974) — India
 Tyrannochthonius brasiliensis Mahnert, 1979 — Brazil
 Tyrannochthonius brevimanus Beier, 1935 — central Africa
 Tyrannochthonius brooksi Harvey, 1991 — western Australia
 Tyrannochthonius butleri Harvey, 1991 — western Australia
 Tyrannochthonius caecatus (Beier, 1976) — New Zealand
 Tyrannochthonius callidus Hoff, 1959 — Jamaica
 Tyrannochthonius cavernicola (Beier, 1976) — Lord Howe Island
 Tyrannochthonius cavicola (Beier, 1967) — Australia
 Tyrannochthonius centralis Beier, 1931 — Costa Rica, Ecuador
 Tyrannochthonius chamarro J.C. Chamberlin, 1947 — Caroline Islands
 Tyrannochthonius chamberlini Muchmore, 1996 — Alabama
 Tyrannochthonius charon Muchmore, 1996 — Alabama
 Tyrannochthonius chelatus Murthy & Ananthakrishnan, 1977 — India
 Tyrannochthonius confusus Mahnert, 1986 — Kenya
 Tyrannochthonius contractus (Tullgren, 1907) — Africa
 Tyrannochthonius convivus Beier, 1974 — India
 Tyrannochthonius curazavius Wagenaar-Hummelinck, 1948 — Curacao
 Tyrannochthonius densedentatus (Beier, 1967) — New Zealand
 Tyrannochthonius diabolus Muchmore, 1996 — Alabama
 Tyrannochthonius ecuadoricus (Beier, 1977) — Ecuador, Peru
 Tyrannochthonius elegans Beier, 1944 — central Africa
 Tyrannochthonius erebicus Muchmore, 1996 — Alabama
 Tyrannochthonius felix Muchmore, 1996 — Alabama
 Tyrannochthonius ferox Mahnert, 1978 — Republic of Congo
 Tyrannochthonius fiskei Muchmore, 1996 — Tennessee
 Tyrannochthonius floridensis Malcolm & Muchmore, 1985 — Florida
 Tyrannochthonius gezei Vachon, 1941 — Cameroon
 Tyrannochthonius gigas Beier, 1954 — Venezuela
 Tyrannochthonius gnomus Muchmore, 1996 — Alabama
 Tyrannochthonius gomyi Mahnert, 1975 — Reunion
 Tyrannochthonius grimmeti J.C. Chamberlin, 1929 — New Zealand
 Tyrannochthonius guadeloupensis Vitali-di Castri, 1984 — Guadeloupe
 Tyrannochthonius halopotamus Muchmore, 1996 — Alabama
 Tyrannochthonius helenae (Beier, 1977) — St. Helena
 Tyrannochthonius heterodentatus Beier, 1930 — India
 Tyrannochthonius horridus (Beier, 1976) — New Zealand
 Tyrannochthonius hypogeus Muchmore, 1996 — Kentucky
 Tyrannochthonius imitatus Hoff, 1959 — Jamaica, Dominican Republic
 Tyrannochthonius infernalis Muchmore, 1996 — Alabama
 Tyrannochthonius innominatus Muchmore, 1996 — Florida
 Tyrannochthonius innoxius Hoff, 1959 — Jamaica
 Tyrannochthonius insulae Hoff, 1946 — Trinidad
 Tyrannochthonius intermedius Muchmore, 1986 — Mexico
 Tyrannochthonius irmleri Mahnert, 1979 — Brazil
 Tyrannochthonius japonicus (Ellingsen, 1907) — Japan, Taiwan
 Tyrannochthonius japonicus japonicus (Ellingsen, 1907) — Japan, Taiwan
 Tyrannochthonius japonicus dogoensis Morikawa, 1954 — Japan
 Tyrannochthonius jonesi Chamberlin, in Muchmore & Chamberlin 1995 — Alabama
 Tyrannochthonius kermadecensis (Beier, 1976) — New Zealand
 Tyrannochthonius krakatau Harvey, 1988 — Indonesia
 Tyrannochthonius laevis Beier, 1966 — Australia
 Tyrannochthonius luxtoni (Beier, 1967) — New Zealand
 Tyrannochthonius mahunkai Mahnert, 1978 — Republic of Congo
 Tyrannochthonius meneghettii (Caporiacco, 1949) — central Africa
 Tyrannochthonius meruensis Beier, 1962 — Eastern Africa
 Tyrannochthonius migrans Mahnert, 1979 — Brazil
 Tyrannochthonius minor Mahnert, 1979 — Brazil
 Tyrannochthonius monodi Vachon, 1941 — Cameroon
 Tyrannochthonius nanus (Beier, 1966) — New Guinea
 Tyrannochthonius nergal Chamberlin, in Muchmore & Chamberlin 1995 — Alabama
 Tyrannochthonius noaensis Moyle, 1989 — New Zealand
 Tyrannochthonius norfolkensis (Beier, 1976) — Norfolk Islands
 Tyrannochthonius oahuanus Muchmore, 2000 — Hawaii, Oahu, Koolau Range, Puu Konahuanui, Pacific Islands
 Tyrannochthonius orpheus Muchmore, 1996 — Alabama
 Tyrannochthonius osiris Chamberlin, in Muchmore & Chamberlin 1995 — Alabama
 Tyrannochthonius ovatus Vitali-di Castro, 1984 — Martinique
 Tyrannochthonius pachythorax Redikorzev, 1938 — Vietnam
 Tyrannochthonius palauanus Beier, 1957 — Caroline Islands
 Tyrannochthonius pallidus Muchmore, 1973 — Mexico
 Tyrannochthonius parvus Chamberlin, in Muchmore & Chamberlin 1995 — Alabama
 Tyrannochthonius pecki Muchmore, 1996 — Alabama
 Tyrannochthonius perpusillus Beier, 1951 — Vietnam
 Tyrannochthonius philippinus (Beier, 1966) — Philippines
 Tyrannochthonius pholeter Muchmore, 1996 — Alabama
 Tyrannochthonius pluto Chamberlin, in Muchmore & Chamberlin 1995 — Alabama
 Tyrannochthonius procerus Mahnert, 1978 — Republic of Congo
 Tyrannochthonius proximus Hoff, 1959 — Jamaica, Dominican Republic
 Tyrannochthonius pugnax Mahnert, 1978 — Republic of Congo
 Tyrannochthonius pupukeanus Muchmore, 1983 — Hawaii
 Tyrannochthonius pusillimus Beier, 1951 — Vietnam
 Tyrannochthonius pusillus Beier, 1955 — Peru
 Tyrannochthonius queenslandicus (Beier, 1969) — Australia
 Tyrannochthonius rahmi Beier, 1976 — Nepal, Bhutan
 Tyrannochthonius rex Harvey, 1989 — Australia
 Tyrannochthonius riberai Mahnert, 1984 — Peru
 Tyrannochthonius robustus Beier, 1951 — Vietnam
 Tyrannochthonius rotundimanus Mahnert, 1985 — Brazil
 Tyrannochthonius satan Muchmore, 1996 — Alabama
 Tyrannochthonius semidentatus (Redikorzev, 1924) — Kenya
 Tyrannochthonius semihorridus (Beier, 1969) — Australia
 Tyrannochthonius setiger Mahnert, 1997 — Tenerife, Cueva del Sobrado, Canary Islands
 Tyrannochthonius sheltae Muchmore, 1996 — Alabama
 Tyrannochthonius similidentatus Sato, 1984 — Japan
 Tyrannochthonius simillimus Beier, 1951 — Cambodia
 Tyrannochthonius simulans Mahnert, 1986 — Kenya
 Tyrannochthonius skeletonis Muchmore, 1996 — Alabama
 Tyrannochthonius sokolovi (Redikorzev, 1924) — central Africa
 Tyrannochthonius sparsedentatus Beier, 1959 — Democratic Republic of Congo
 Tyrannochthonius spinatus Hong, in Yong Hong, Tae Heung Kim & Won Koo Le 1996 — South Korea
 Tyrannochthonius steevesi Muchmore, 1996 — Tennessee
 Tyrannochthonius stonei Muchmore, 1989 — Hawaii
 Tyrannochthonius strinatii (Beier, 1974) — Guatemala
 Tyrannochthonius stygius Muchmore, 1996 — Alabama
 Tyrannochthonius superstes Mahnert, 1986 — Canary Islands
 Tyrannochthonius suppressalis Hong, in Yong Hong, Tae Heung Kim & Won Koo Le 1996 — South Korea
 Tyrannochthonius swiftae Muchmore, 1993 — Hawaii
 Tyrannochthonius tartarus Muchmore, 1996 — Alabama
 Tyrannochthonius tekauriensis Moyle, 1989 — New Zealand
 Tyrannochthonius tenuis Chamberlin, in Muchmore & Chamberlin 1995 — Alabama
 Tyrannochthonius terribilis (With, 1906) — southeast Asia
 Tyrannochthonius terribilis terribilis (With, 1906) — southeast Asia
 Tyrannochthonius terribilis malaccensis Beier, 1952 — Malaysia
 Tyrannochthonius tlilapanensis Muchmore, 1986 — Mexico
 Tyrannochthonius torodei Muchmore, 1996 — Alabama
 Tyrannochthonius troglobius Muchmore, 1969 — Mexico
 Tyrannochthonius troglodytes Muchmore, 1986 — Texas
 Tyrannochthonius troglophilus (Beier, 1968) — New Caledonia
 Tyrannochthonius vampirorum Muchmore, 1986 — Mexico
 Tyrannochthonius volcancillo Muchmore, 1986 — Mexico
 Tyrannochthonius volcanus Muchmore, 1977 — Mexico
 Tyrannochthonius wittei Beier, 1955
 Tyrannochthonius wlassicsi (Daday, 1897) — New Guinea
 Tyrannochthonius zicsii Mahnert, 1978 — Republic of Congo
 Tyrannochthonius zonatus (Beier, 1964) — New Caledonia

 Vulcanochthonius Muchmore, 2000
 Vulcanochthonius aa Muchmore, 2000 — Hawaii, Manuka Natural Area Reserve, Visor Cave, Pacific Islands
 Vulcanochthonius howarthi (Muchmore, 1979) — Hawaii
 Vulcanochthonius pohakuloae Muchmore, 2000 — Hawaii, Mauna Kea, Pohakuloa Training Area, Bobcat Trail, Pacific Islands

References
 Joel Hallan's Biology Catalog: Chthoniidae

Chthoniidae
Chthoniidae